Preston Bus is a bus operator running in the city of Preston, England, and surrounding areas. It is a subsidiary of Rotala. It gained some notoriety in 2009 when the Competition Commission ordered Stagecoach to sell it.

History

Preston Bus was founded in June 1904 as Preston District Travel and operated a number of services in the Preston area. To comply with the Transport Act 1985, in 1986 the assets were transferred to a new legal entity, Preston Borough Transport Limited. In 1993, it was sold in a management buyout.

In 2006, Preston Bus was subject to some high-profile competition from Stagecoach North West. Competition escalated into a bus war with Stagecoach offering lower fares on the busiest routes. The managing director of Preston Bus was concerned Stagecoach could force his company out of business. Both companies accused each other of unprofessional behaviour.  On 10 June 2008, the two companies agreed to a code of practice by the traffic commissioner. The competition continued, with Stagecoach operating routes within Preston and Preston Bus commencing a service between Preston and Penwortham, and a limited service between Preston and Southport, duplicating existing Stagecoach routes.

On 23 January 2009, Preston Bus was sold to Stagecoach. The routes operated by Preston Bus were rebranded as Stagecoach in Preston from March 2009.

In November 2009 the Competition Commission ruled that the takeover by Stagecoach had adversely affected competition in the area and ordered Stagecoach sell Preston Bus. Following this ruling, the Preston Bus name and logo was reinstated and the company was operated at arm's length from the main Stagecoach business. In January 2011 Preston Bus was sold to Rotala.

Fleet
The Preston Bus fleet was originally all double deckers, but latterly the company moved to single deckers and minibuses, with the most common vehicle in 2008 being the Optare Solo midibus.

As at February 2014, the fleet consisted of 102 buses. Until the 1970s, fleet livery was cream and red when a blue and cream scheme was introduced. Upon the sale to Rotala, a cream, green and blue livery was introduced in 2011.

References

External links

Preston Bus website

Bus operators in Lancashire
Companies based in Preston
Rotala
Bus wars
Transport companies established in 1904
Transport in the City of Preston
1904 establishments in England